The End of Everything is the second extended play (EP) by American singer Noah Cyrus. It was released on May 15, 2020, and was preceded by the singles "July", "Lonely", "I Got So High That I Saw Jesus" and "Young & Sad". The EP features a duet with Ant Clemons titled "Wonder Years". The End of Everything is a pop EP influenced by R&B, country, and gospel.

Singles
The first single from the EP was "July". It was released on July 31, 2019 with its music video. The song experienced strong commercial performance, achieving Platinum plaques in the United States, Canada and Australia. On November 8, Cyrus would release a remix of the song with vocals from American singer Leon Bridges. The second single was "Lonely", released on September 27, 2019 and with a music video premiere on October 7, 2019. Its third single was released on March 20, 2020 with a music video, called "I Got So High That I Saw Jesus". "Young & Sad" was released on July 13, 2020 as the fourth and final single.

Critical reception
Neil Z. Yeung of AllMusic praised the EP, saying it "offers a vulnerable peek into the singer/songwriter's mental and emotional struggles through heartfelt and simple offerings."

Tour
On January 8, 2020, Cyrus announced The Not So Tour, Tour, a 3-date-long limited concert tour with one show in London, Europe, and two in the United States, North America. The tour started on February 11, and ended on March 11.

Track listing

Charts

References

2020 EPs
Noah Cyrus albums
EPs by American artists
Pop music EPs